Bimakalim is a potassium channel opener.

References

Potassium channel openers
2-Pyridones
Benzopyrans
Nitriles